Tattvārthasūtra, meaning "On the Nature [artha] of Reality [tattva]" (also known as Tattvarth-adhigama-sutra or Moksha-shastra) is an ancient Jain text written by Acharya Umaswami in Sanskrit, sometime between the 2nd- and 5th-century CE. 

The Tattvārthasūtra is regarded as one of the earliest, most authoritative texts in Jainism. It is accepted as authoritative in both its major sub-traditions – Digambara and Śvētāmbara – as well as the minor sub-traditions. It is a philosophical text, and its importance in Jainism is comparable with that of the Brahma Sutras and Yoga Sutras of Patanjali in Hinduism. In an aphoristic sutra style of ancient Indian texts, it presents the complete Jainism philosophy in 350 sutras over 10 chapters. The text has attracted numerous commentaries, translations and interpretations since the 5th-century.

One of its sutras, Parasparopagraho Jivanam is the motto of Jainism. Its meaning is interpreted as "(The function) of souls is to help one another", or "Souls render service to one another".

Names
Tattvartha Sutra is also known in Jainism as the Moksha-shastra (Scripture describing the path of liberation).

Content 
The text written in Sanskrit, begins with an invocation:
The first verse of Tattvārthsūtra, "" summarizes the Jaina path to liberation. It means that the Ratnatraya (three jewels: right view, right knowledge and right conduct) collectively constitutes the path to liberation or moksha.

Its ten chapters are:
Faith and Knowledge
The Category of the Living
The Lower World and the Middle World
The Celestial Beings
The Category of the Non-Living
Influx of Karma
The Five Vows
Bondage of Karma
Stoppage and Shedding of Karma
Liberation

The first chapter deals with the process of cognition and details about different types of knowledge. The next three chapters deal with the Jīva (soul), lower worlds, naraka, and celestial abodes, devas. The fifth chapter discusses the Non-soul (ajīva). The next three chapters deal with the karmas and their manifestations and the influx, asrava, good and bad karma, shubha-ashubha karma and the bondage of the karmas. The ninth chapter describes the blocking, samvara and shedding of the karmas, nirjara. The final chapter discusses moksha or the liberation of the soul.

Seven categories of truth
The theology in Tattvartha Sutra presents seven categories of truth in sutra 1.4:
Souls exist
Non-sentient matter exists
Karmic particles exist that inflow to each soul
Karmic particles bind to the soul {which transmigrate with rebirth} 
Karmic particles inflow can be stopped
Karmic particles can fall away from soul
Complete release of karmic particles leads to liberation from worldly bondage

Umaswami categorizes the types of knowledge to be empirical, attained through one's sense of perception. He adds that knowledge is also acquired through literature, clairvoyance, and omniscience. In chapter 2, Umaswati presents sutras on soul. He asserts that soul is distinguished by suppression of deluding karma, or elimination of eight types of karmas, or partial presence of destructive karmas, or arising of eight types of new karmas, or those that are innate to the soul, or a combination of these. In chapter 3 through 6, Umaswati presents sutras for his first three categories of truth.

Ethics

In chapter 7, Umaswati presents the Jaina vows and explains their value in stopping karmic particle inflow to the soul. The vows, with their respective translations by Nathmal Tatia, are 
ahimsa (abstinence from violence)
 anirta (abstinence from falsehood)
 asteya (abstinence from stealing)
 brahmacharya (abstinence from carnality), and
 aparigraha (abstinence from possessiveness).

Karma and rebirths

Umaswati, in chapter 8 of Tattvartha Sutra presents his sutras on how karma affects rebirths. He asserts that accumulated karma in life determines the length of life and realm of rebirth for each soul in each of four states – infernal beings, plants and animals, human beings and as gods. Further, states Umaswati, karma also affects the body, the shape, the characteristics as well as the status of the soul within the same species, such as Ucchi (upper) or Nicchi (lower) status. The accumulated and new karma are material particles, states Umaswati, which stick to the soul and these travel with the soul from one life to the next as bondage, where each ripens. Once ripened, the karmic particles fall off, states Umaswati.

Shedding karma and liberation

The chapter 9 of Tattvartha Sutra states how karmic particles can be stopped from attaching to the soul and how these can be shed. Umaswati asserts that gupti (curbing activity), dharma (virtues such as forbearance, modesty, purity, truthfulness, self-restraint, austerity, renunciation), contemplation, endurance in hardship (he lists twenty two hardships including hunger, thirst, cold, heat, nakedness, injury, lack of gain, illness, praise, disrespect), and with good character towards others (he lists five – equanimity, reinitiation, non-injury (Ahimsa), slight passion and fair conduct), a soul stops karmic accumulations. External austerities such as fasting, reduced diet and isolated habitation, along with internal austerities such as expiation, reverence, service, renunciation and meditation, according to Umaswati, along with respectful service to teachers and ailing ascetics help shed karma.

The state of liberation is presented in Chapter 10 by Umaswati. It is achieved when deluding and obstructive karmas have been destroyed. This leads to the state of quietism and potentiality, and the soul then moves to the end of the universe, states Umaswati.

Importance
The Tattvartha Sutra is regarded as one of the earliest, most authoritative book on Jainism, and the only text authoritative in both the Digambara and Śvētāmbara sects, and its importance in Jainism is comparable with that of the Brahma Sutras and Yoga Sutras of Patanjali in Hinduism.

Commentaries and Translations

Commentaries 
The Tattvartha Sutra has the largest number of Jaina bhashyas or commentaries in different Indian languages from the fifth century onward. There are over twenty-five commentaries and translations of Tattvartha Sutra, including those by:

Umasvati himself wrote a commentary on the text. The next oldest and the most famous commentary on the Tattvārthasūtra is Sarvārthasiddhi of Ācārya Pujyapada (sixth century CE). Sarvārthasiddhi along with Akalanka's c. 780 CE Rajavartika and Vijayananda's Slokavarttika (9th century) form the central texts of Digambara monastic students.

Translations
The text is in sutra form. The word Sutra (Sanskrit: सूत्र) means "string, thread". The root of the word is siv, that which sews and holds things together. In the context of Indian literature, Sutra means a distilled collection of syllables and words, any form or manual of "aphorism, rule, direction" hanging together like threads with which the "teachings of ritual, philosophy, grammar or any field of knowledge" can be woven.

The distilled nature of sutra texts leave them open to varying interpretations. The Tattvartha sutra have been variously translated. The first verse of Tattvartha Sutra has been translated as follows, for example:

The text has been translated into many languages including English and German, latest being English translation in 1993.

See also

Samayasāra
Jain literature
Tattva (Jainism)

Notes

References

Further reading

External links 
 Tattvartha Sutra with Sarvarthasiddhi English translation by Vijay K. Jain, 2018 (includes glossary)
Tattvarthasutra, with Hindi and English translation on crossasia repository
Tattvarthsutra (English) on archive.org

Ancient Indian literature
Atomism
Epistemology of religion
Metaphysics of religion
Jain texts
Jain ethics